Legends from Beyond the Galactic Terrorvortex is the third studio album by Anglo-Swiss symphonic power metal band Gloryhammer. It was released on 31 May 2019. It is the final album to feature vocalist Thomas Winkler.

Story

After Earth was destroyed by the Hootsman in order to stop Zargothrax from summoning the Elder god Kor-Virliath, Zargothrax fled into the wormhole that was opened as a result ("Into the Terrorvortex of Kor-Virliath"). Angus McFife XIII followed him into the wormhole and upon reaching the other side he discovered a terrible alternate reality ("The Siege of Dunkeld (In Hoots We Trust)"). Zargothrax has corrupted this reality and is slaughtering the peasants of the world. Angus attempts to stop Zargothrax but quickly finds that the Hammer of Glory has no power in this dimension. While Angus flees, Zargothrax proclaims himself the emperor of this land, commanding the corrupted Dreadlord Ser Proletius and the deathknights of Crail to slaughter more peasants in Auchtermuchty ("Masters of the Galaxy"). Angus McFife is told about a resistance far north in the Land of the Unicorns.

Upon reaching the resistance, he is met by Ralathor, the hermit of Cowdenbeath, now known as Submarine Commander Ralathor ("Land of Unicorns"). Ralathor tells Angus that he needs to charge his hammer by bringing it to the sun of this world, and to do this, he must find the Legendary Enchanted Jetpack ("Power of the Laser Dragon Fire"). Angus quests away to acquire the jetpack ("Legendary Enchanted Jetpack") and uses it to fly into outer space where he recharges his legendary Hammer of Glory ("Gloryhammer"). Returning to Fife, the resistance gathers aboard the flying Submarine, the DSS Hootsforce ("Hootsforce"). They head to Dunkeld and engage the forces of Zargothrax ("Battle for Eternity").

As the solar conjunction draws close, although Ralathor is able to wipe out Proletius and his deathknights, Zargothrax proclaims that there is nothing they can do to stop his ascension to godhood . Then a mighty hero with holy armor made from wolf descends from the heavens. This hero is soon revealed to be the Hootsman, who was not killed in the explosion but was instead merged with the fabric of reality and became a god in this universe. The Hootsman yells to Zargothrax that he is the one and only true god of this universe and with his power combined with the Hammer of Glory, they defeat Zargothrax forever.

However, as Zargothrax falls to liquid dust, Angus McFife realizes he was impaled by the Knife of Evil and will soon be left to the same fate that Ser Proletius was left to. Realizing that he would soon turn for the worse, Angus McFife ends his own life in the raging fires of Mount Schiehallion. As Angus dies, there is a mysterious morse code transmission reading out "Activate Zargothrax Clone: Alpha 1", implying that the battle for Fife is not over just yet. ("The Fires of Ancient Cosmic Destiny").

Track listing

Notes
 The digipak edition of the album includes a second disc with the instrumental version of disc one.

Personnel
Credits for Legends from Beyond the Galactic Terrorvortex adapted from liner notes.

Gloryhammer
 Thomas Winkler, "Angus McFife XIII" – lead vocals
 Christopher Bowes, "Dark Lord Zargothrax" – keyboards, additional vocals
 Paul Templing, "Grandmaster Proletius" – guitars
 James Cartwright, "Hootsman" – bass, additional vocals
 Ben Turk, "Sub Commander Ralathor" – drums, programming

Additional musician
 Jens Johansson – keyboard solo (track 9)

Choir
 Amy Turk, Charlotte Jones, Chris Charles, David Stanton, Dominic Sewell, Katrina Riberio

Production
 Lasse Lammert – production, mixing, mastering
 Dan Goldsworthy – cover art, artwork, layout
 Robert Zembrzycki – photography
 Jessy Martens – vocal coach
 Travis Whalley – editing
 Matthew Bell – songwriting (track 5)

Charts

References

2019 albums
Gloryhammer albums
Napalm Records albums